Megami is a Japanese anime, bishōjo, and video game magazine which is known for its centerfolds.

Megami may also refer to:
Megami Tensei, a Japanese role-playing video game series
Oh My Goddess!, a manga and anime series known in Japanese as Aa! Megami-sama (ああっ女神さまっ)
Megami: Legacy for the Gods, a soon-to-be released sequel to the short sci-fi film Food for the Gods
Megami: Search for the Gods, a soon-to-be released sequel to the short sci-fi films Food for the Gods and Megami: Legacy for the Gods

See also
Ogami (disambiguation)